The Big Three, sometimes known as The Heatles, were a trio of professional basketball players – LeBron James, Dwyane Wade, and Chris Bosh – who played for the Miami Heat of the National Basketball Association (NBA) from 2010 to 2014. James, Bosh, and Wade had been selected as the 1st, 4th, and 5th picks in the 2003 NBA draft, and became scoring leaders for their respective franchises over their first seven seasons.

History
After re-signing Wade following the 2009–10 season, the Heat secured the signings of both Bosh and James in free agency, with the latter being announced in the television special The Decision. The trio led the Heat to the NBA Finals in each of their four seasons together, and won back-to-back championships in 2012 and 2013. After losing the Finals to the San Antonio Spurs the following season, James opted out of a contract extension, and returned to play for the Cleveland Cavaliers.

Records and statistics

Season-by-season team record 
Note: GP = Games played, W = Wins, L = Losses, W–L% = Winning percentage

Season-by-season player statistics 

 Lead team

2010–11 regular season

2011 playoffs

2011–12 regular season

2012 playoffs

2012–13 regular season

2013 playoffs

2013–14 regular season

2014 playoffs

Aftermath
Both Wade and Bosh continued to play for the Heat for two additional seasons after James' departure, before Wade departed Miami and signed with the Chicago Bulls, while Bosh ultimately retired due to medical reasons. On September 27, 2017, Wade signed a one-year contract with the Cavaliers, reuniting him with James. On February 8, 2018, at the NBA trade deadline, the Cavaliers traded Wade back to the Miami Heat in exchange for a protected 2024 second-round draft pick. On September 16, 2018, Wade announced his plan to retire from the NBA effective after the 2018–19 season and Chris Bosh officially announced his retirement on February 12, 2019 in his Miami Heat jersey retirement ceremony.

Legacy
The trio have been credited with having a dramatic influence on the NBA, specifically relating to team development and general management. Many teams in subsequent seasons have sought to adopt the "Big Three" model of courting established NBA superstars to their franchises, in order to win championships.

References

2010 beginnings
2014 endings
2010–11 NBA season
2011–12 NBA season
2012–13 NBA season
2013–14 NBA season
2010s in Miami
21st-century African-American people

African-American history in Miami

LeBron James
 
Nicknamed groups of NBA players
Trios